Zinc finger MYM-type protein 2 is a protein that in humans is encoded by the ZMYM2 gene.

See also 

 Chromosome 13 (human)
 Myeloproliferative neoplasm
 Zinc finger protein

References

Further reading